Mark Maryanovich is a Canadian photographer and artist. He is known primarily for his photography in the music industry.

Biography 
Born in Windsor, Ontario and raised in Kamloops, British Columbia, Maryanovich relocated to Montreal, Quebec in 1995, where he met and was mentored by fashion photographer Raphael Mazzucco. In 1996, Maryanovich's career as a photographer began in Vancouver, British Columbia, and over the next fifteen years he shot with various artists such as Colin James, Gordie Johnson (Big Sugar), Tom Wilson (Junkhouse), Ryan Dahle (Limblifter, Age of Electric) and The Tea Party.

His photography has been used by artists such as Terraplane Sun, Marianas Trench (604 Records) and Grammy Award winners 54*40.

One of his images was used on the cover of Randy Bachman's autobiography Vinyl Tap Stories.  In 2012, he received a Canadian Country Music Award for Album Design of the Year for Dean Brody's Dirt. He also received the award in 2009 for George Canyon's What I Do.

In 2011, Maryanovich relocated to Santa Monica, California where he currently resides.

References

External links 
 Official Website
 twitter
 Chris Cornell Signature Gibson ES-335 Guitar
 "Shooting the Music: A Backstage Pass Interview with Musician Photographer Mark Maryanovich by Aaron Bethune" Regional Musician magazine
 ION Magazine Focus: Mark Maryanovich Photography
 Music Box Artist Consulting; Q&A With Renowned Photographer Mark Maryanovich
 The Georgia Strait 
 Terraplane Sun buzzworthy.mtv.com
 Michael Bernard Fitzgerald Groundsounds
 The Filthy Souls statusmagonline.com
 Dead Day Revolution Regional Musician magazine
 Sal Costa My Darkest Days Guitarworld 

Year of birth missing (living people)
Artists from Windsor, Ontario
Living people
Canadian portrait photographers